Amishra is an Indian screenplay writer and lyricist in Bollywood films. He is most noted for his work in the Shyam Benegal film Welcome to Sajjanpur (in which he wrote the lyrics for the songs Sita Ram, Dildara Dildara Sine Mein, Aadmi Aazad Hai and Munni Ki Baari Are Mandir). he is from satna (m.p.)

Filmography

References

External links

Living people
Year of birth missing (living people)
Hindi-language lyricists
Indian male screenwriters
Best Original Screenplay National Film Award winners